Montemiletto is a town and comune in the province of Avellino, Campania, Italy.

The population of Montemiletto is roughly 5,400.

References

See also
Irpinia

Cities and towns in Campania